The play-offs of the 2017 Fed Cup Americas Zone Group I were the final stages of the Group I Zonal Competition involving teams from the Americas. Using the positions determined in their pools, the nine teams faced off to determine their placing in the 2017 Fed Cup Americas Zone Group I. The winner of the promotion play-off advanced to World Group II Play-offs, and the losers of the relegation play-off were relegated down to the Americas Zone Group II.

Pool results

Promotion play-off 
The first placed teams of the two pools were drawn in head-to-head rounds. The winner advanced to the World Group II Play-offs.

Canada vs. Chile

Third place play-off 
The runner-up teams of the two pools were drawn in head-to-head to determine the third and fourth placings.

Paraguay vs. Argentina

Relegation play-offs 
The bottom two teams of the two pools were drawn in head-to-head. The loser was relegated down to Americas Zone Group II in 2018.

Venezuela vs. Mexico

Bolivia vs. Brazil

Final placements 

  advanced to World Group II play-offs.

References

External links 
 Fed Cup website

2017 Fed Cup Americas Zone